The Folklore Society (FLS) is a national association in the United Kingdom for the study of folklore.

It was founded in London in 1878 to study traditional vernacular culture, including traditional music, song, dance and drama, narrative, arts and crafts, customs and belief. The foundation was prompted by a suggestion made by Eliza Gutch in the pages of Notes and Queries.

The Society is a registered charity under English law.

The Folklore Society office is at The Royal Anthropological Institute of Great Britain and Ireland, 50 Fitzroy Street, London.

Members
William Thoms, the editor of Notes and Queries who had first introduced the term folk-lore, seems to have been instrumental in the formation of the society and, along with G. L. Gomme, was for many years a leading member.

Some prominent members were identified as the "great team" in Richard Dorson's now long outdated 1967 history of British folklore, late-Victorian leaders of the surge of intellectual interest in the field, these were Andrew Lang, Edwin Sidney Hartland, Alfred Nutt, William Alexander Clouston, Edward Clodd and Gomme. Later historians have taken a deeper interest in the pre-modern views of members such as Joseph Jacobs.
A long-serving member and steady contributor to the society's discourse and publications was Charlotte Sophia Burne, the first woman to become editor of its journal and later president (1909–10) of the society. Ethel Rudkin, the Lincolnshire folklorist, was a notable member; her publications included several articles in the journal, as well as the book Lincolshire Folklore.

Publications
The society publishes, in partnership with Taylor and Francis, the journal  Folklore in four issues per year, and since 1986 a newsletter, FLS News.

The journal began as The Folk-Lore Record in 1878, continued or was restarted as The Folk-Lore Journal, and from 1890 its issues were compiled as volumes entitled "Folk-Lore: A Quarterly Review of Myth, Tradition, Institution, & Custom. Incorporating The Archæological Review and The Folk-Lore Journal". Joseph Jacobs edited the first four annual volumes as the Quarterly Review, succeeded by Alfred Nutt. As the head of David Nutt in the Strand, Alfred Nutt was the publisher from 1890.

Charlotte Burne edited the journal between 1899 and 1908.  The editorship then passed to A. R. Wright (1909–14); William Crooke (1915–23); A. R. Wright (1924–31); E. O. James (1932–55); Christina Hole (1956–78); Jacqueline Simpson (1979–93); Gillian Bennett (1994–2004), Patricia Lysaght (2004-2012) and Jessica Hemming (2013-)

Collections 
The Folklore Society Library has around 15,000 books and more than 200 serial titles (40 currently received) and is held at University College London Library. Its major strengths are in folk narrative and British and Irish folklore; there are also substantial holdings of east European folklore books, and long runs of Estonian and Basque folklore serials.

The Folklore Society Archives and Collections include folklore-related papers of G. L. Gomme and Lady Gomme, T. F. Ordish, William Crooke, Henry Underhill, Estella Canziani, Denis Galloway, Barbara Aitken, Margaret Murray, Katharine Briggs and others. The society's archives and collections are held at University College London's Special Collections.

Presidents

 1878–79 James Grimston, 2nd Earl of Verulam
 1880–85 Frederick Lygon, 6th Earl Beauchamp
 1885–88 George Byng, 3rd Earl of Strafford
 1888–92 Andrew Lang
 1892–95 Laurence Gomme
 1895–97 Edward Clodd
 1897–99 Alfred Nutt
 1899–1901 Edwin Hartland
 1901–03 Edward Brabrook
 1903–04 Frederick York Powell
 1904–07 W H D Rouse 
 1907–09 Moses Gaster
 1909–11 Charlotte Burne
 1911–13 William Crooke
 1913–18 Robert Ranulph Marett
 1918–20 Alfred Cort Haddon
 1920–22 W H R Rivers
 1922–24 Henry Balfour
 1924–26 J L Myers
 1926–28 A R Wright
 1928–30 R M Dawkins
 1930–32 E O James
 1932–35 H J Rose
 1935–37 S H Hooke
 1937–39 Mary MacLeod Banks
 1939–43 John Henry Hutton
 1943–45 L F Newman
 1945–47 FitzRoy Somerset, 4th Baron Raglan
 1947–48 H J Fleure
 1948–51 Walter Leo Hildburgh
 1951–53 Arthur Allan Gomme 
 1953–55 Margaret Murray
 1955 T W Bagshawe
 1956 (No president)
 1956–59 Sona Rosa Burstein 
 1959–61 Sir Arthur Waugh 
 1961–63 Mary Williams
 1963–64 Peter Opie
 1964–67 Douglas Kennedy 
 1967–70 Katharine Briggs
 1970–73 Stewart Sanderson 
 1973–76 Hilda Ellis Davidson 
 1976–79 J R Porter
 1979–82 W M S Russell
 1982–84 Carmen Blacker
 1984–87 Venetia Newall 
 1987–90 John Widdowson
 1990–93 Roy Judge 
 1993–96 Jacqueline Simpson
 1996–99 Juliette Wood
 1999–2002 W. F. H. Nicolaisen
 2002–05 Marion Bowman
 2005–08 W. F. Ryan
 2008–11 Eddie Cass 
 2011–14 Robert McDowall 
 2014–17 James H. Grayson
 2017–20 Patricia Lysaght 
 2020–current Owen Davies

Katharine Briggs Award 
The Katharine Briggs Award is an annual book prize awarded by the Society in honour of Katharine Mary Briggs (who was the society's president from 1969 to 1972). The prize has been awarded every year since it was first announced in 1982. Notable winners include Israeli historian of social memory Guy Beiner (2019), American scholar of fairy tales Jack Zipes (2007), English mythographer Marina Warner (1999), British radical historian E. P. Thompson (1992), English married team of folklorists Iona and Peter Opie (1986) and Soviet folklorist Vladimir Propp (1985).

Winners of the Award are:

 1982: Samuel Pyeatt Menefee, Wives for Sale: an Ethnographic Study of British Popular Divorce (Basil Blackwell)
 1983: Michael Pickering, Village Song and Culture (Croom Helm)
 1984: Sandra Billington, A Social History of the Fool (Harvester Press)
 1985: Vladimir Propp, Theory and History of Folklore, edited by Anatoly Liberman (Manchester University Press)
 1986: Iona and Peter Opie, The Singing Game (Oxford University Press)
 1987: Amy Shuman, Storytelling Rights (Cambridge University Press)
 1988: Hilda Ellis Davidson, Myths and Symbols in Pagan Europe (Manchester University Press)
 1989: J. P. Mallory, In Search of the Indo-Europeans Language, Archaeology and Myth (Thames & Hudson)
 1990; Paul Oliver, Blues Fell This Morning (Cambridge University Press)
 1991: Simon Charsley, Rites of Marrying: The Wedding Industry in Scotland (Manchester University Press)
 1992: E. P. Thompson, Customs in Common (Merlin Press)
 1993: Georgina Boyes, The Imagined Village: Culture, Ideology, and the English Folk Revival (Manchester University Press)
 1994: Claudia Kinmonth, Irish Country Furniture 1700-1950 (Yale University Press)
 1995: Timothy Mitchell, Flamenco Deep Song (Yale University Press)
 1996: Mary-Ann Constantine, Breton Ballads (CMCS Publications)
 1997: Neil Jarman, Parading Culture: Parades and Visual Displays in Northern Ireland (Berg)
 1998: Joseph Falaky Nagy, Conversing with Angels and Ancients: The Literary Myths of Medieval Ireland (Four Courts)
 1999: Marina Warner, No Go the Bogeyman: Scaring, Lulling and Making Mock (Chatto and Windus)
 2000: Diarmuid Ó Giolláin, Locating Irish Folklore: Tradition, Modernity, Identity (Cork University Press)
 2001: Adam Fox, Oral and Literate Culture in England, 1500-1700 (Clarendon Press)
 2002: Elizabeth Hallam and Jenny Hockey, Death, Memory and Material Culture (Berg)
 2003: Malcolm Jones, The Secret Middle Ages (Sutton)
 2004: Steve Roud, The Penguin Guide to the Superstitions of Britain and Ireland (Penguin)
 2005: Jeremy Harte, Explore Fairy Traditions (Heart of Albion Press)
 2006: Catherine Rider, Magic and Impotence in the Middle Ages (Oxford University Press)
 2007: Jack Zipes, Why Fairy Tales Stick (Routledge)
 2008: Richard Bebb, Welsh Furniture 1250-1950: a Cultural History of Craftsmanship and Design (Saer Books)
 2009: Kathryn Marsh, The Musical Playground: Global Tradition and Change in Children’s Songs and Games (Oxford University Press)
 2010: Arthur Taylor, Played at the Pub: the Pub Games of Britain (English Heritage Publications)
 2011: Herbert Halpert, edited by John Widdowson, Folk Tales, Trickster Tales and Legends of the Supernatural from the Pinelands of New Jersey (Edwin Mellen Press)
 2012: David Hopkin, Voices of the People in Nineteenth-Century France (Cambridge University Press)
 2013: Karl Bell, The Legend of Spring-Heeled Jack: Victorian Urban Folklore and Popular Cultures (Boydell Press)
 2014: David Atkinson, The Anglo-Scottish Ballad and its Imaginary Contexts (OpenBook Publishers)
 2015: Richard Jenkins, Black Magic and Bogeymen (Cork University Press)
 2016: Lizanne Henderson, Witchcraft and Folk Belief in the Age of Enlightenment: Scotland, 1670-1740 (Palgrave)
 2017: Christopher Josiffe, Gef! The Strange Tale of an Extra-Special Talking Mongoose (Strange Attractor)
 2018: Martin Graebe, As I Walked Out: Sabine Baring Gould and the Search for the Folk Songs of Devon and Cornwall (Signal Books)
 2019: Guy Beiner, Forgetful Remembrance: Social Forgetting and Vernacular Historiography of a Rebellion in Ulster (Oxford University Press)
 2020: William G. Pooley, Body and Tradition in Nineteenth-Century France: Félix Arnaudin and the Moorlands of Gascony, 1870-1914 (Oxford University Press)
2021: Jonathan Y. H. Hui (ed. and trans.), Vilmundar saga viðutan. The Saga of Vilmundur the Outsider (Viking Society for Northern Research)
2022: Marina Montesano (ed.) Folklore, Magic, and Witchcraft: Cultural Exchanges from the Twelfth to Eighteenth Century (Routledge)

Coote Lake Medal 

The Coote Lake medal is awarded by the Committee of the Folklore Society for "outstanding research and scholarship" in the field of Folklore Studies.

The award is named in honour of Harold Coote Lake (1878-1939), an active member of the Folklore Society in the 1920s and 1930s (who served as both Treasurer and Secretary of the Society at points in that period).

The recipients have been:

 1940 Mary MacLeod Banks
 1941 Dr T. E. Lones
 1952 Dr Walter Leo Hildburgh
 1955 Professor Edward Oliver James
 1960 Iona and Peter Opie
 1968 Alex Helm and Enid Porter
 1979 Christina Hole
 1983 Theo Brown and Stewart Sanderson
 1984 Ethel Rudkin and Dr Hilda Davidson
 1987 Dr Emily Lyle and Dr Ian Russell
 2000 Professor John Widdowson and Dr Roy Judge
 2006 Dr Venetia Newall
 2007 Dr Jaqueline Simpson and Dr ‘Doc’ Rowe
 2008 Jennifer Westwood
 2013 Professor Patricia Lysaght
 2014 Malcolm Taylor and Dr Eddie Cass
 2018 Dr Gillian Bennett and Dr Caroline Oates

References

External links
Folklore Society web site
Free online issues of the Folklore journal and predecessors, 1868-1922
Folklore Society Collections at University College London

Publishing companies of the United Kingdom
Learned societies of the United Kingdom
English folklorists
1878 establishments in England
Organizations established in 1878
Folklore studies
Charities based in England